Relations between Vietnam and the Palestine have been strong and very friendly. Vietnam had established very close relations with the Palestine Liberation Organization (PLO) and was one of the first countries to recognize the State of Palestine.

History 
During the height of the Vietnam War in 1968, the Democratic Republic of Vietnam or North Vietnam under its President Ho Chi Minh established diplomatic relations with the Palestine Liberation Organization. In 1976 the PLO mission was established in Hanoi and it was later upgraded into an embassy in 1982. During the Sino-Vietnamese War in 1979, the PLO sided with Vietnam and condemned China.  After the Palestinian Declaration of Independence, Vietnam recognized Palestine on 19 November 1988 and the Palestinian Leader Yasser Arafat had visited Vietnam more than 10 times. The last one was in August 1988.

Recent Relations
During the 2008-2009 Gaza War, Vietnam condemned "all indiscriminate attacks against civilians," and urged both parties to seek a peaceful solution to the conflict. Vietnam's Deputy Foreign Minister said, "We urged Israel to stop the excessive and disproportionate use of force, end its military operations and immediately withdraw forces from Gaza." Vietnam called on Israel to immediately lift its blockade and allow humanitarian workers into Gaza.
After the 31 May 2010 Gaza flotilla raid, Vietnam cancelled the scheduled visit of Israeli President Shimon Peres.
During the 2014 Israel-Gaza conflict, Foreign Ministry spokesman Le Hai said: "Vietnam strongly concern escalating violence inflicting severe casualties to civilians. We urge the parties concerned to stop firing, resuming the negotiations and supported the efforts of the international community in order to soon bring peace and stability to the region."

On May 14, 2018, when the U.S. opened its embassy in Jerusalem, Vietnam's Foreign Ministry denied having sent any representative to the event, in response to certain media outlets' saying that Vietnam was amongst the 32 countries attending the opening ceremony.

Vietnam's relations with Israel

Ever since Vietnam normalized relationship with Israel, Vietnam has emerged as one of Israel's top partners in Asia. Increasing relationship between Vietnam and Israel has played huge role that making the relationship between Vietnam and Palestine less important than usual. Nonetheless, Vietnam remains supportive of an independent Palestine under the two-state solution.

Diplomatic representation 
 has a resident embassy in Hanoi
 is represented to Palestine through its embassy in Cairo.

See also 
Foreign relations of Palestine
Foreign relations of Vietnam
Israel–Vietnam relations

References 

 
Bilateral relations of Vietnam
Vietnam